Marlon Torres (born 17 April 1996) is a Colombian professional footballer.

References

External links
 

Living people
1996 births
Colombian footballers
Association football defenders
Categoría Primera A players
Categoría Primera B players
Leones F.C. footballers
Atlético Bucaramanga footballers
América de Cali footballers
Sportspeople from Barranquilla